The Grove of Eagles is a 1963 historical novel by the British writer Winston Graham. It is set in Cornwall during the Elizabethan era around the time of the Spanish Armada. The period was of particular interest to Graham and he wrote a non-fiction book The Spanish Armadas in 1972.

References

Bibliography
 George Stade & Karen Karbiener. Encyclopedia of British Writers, 1800 to the Present, Volume 2. 2010.

1963 British novels
Novels by Winston Graham
British historical novels
Novels set in the 16th century
Novels set in Cornwall
Novels set in Spain
Hodder & Stoughton books